Giulia Sergas (born 26 December 1979) is an Italian professional golfer, currently playing on both the LPGA Tour and the Ladies European Tour.

Early life
Sergas was born in Trieste in northern Italy. She took up golf at the age of nine at Golf Club Trieste under the coaching of Ezio Pavan. She attended the Linguistic College.

Amateur career
In 1996 and again in 1998, Sergas was a member of the runner-up World Amateur Team Championship (Espirito Santo Trophy) teams. In 1998 she won the European Ladies Amateur Championship. She finished as lead amateur in the 1999 Women's British Open where she tied for 24th place.

Professional career
Sergas turned professional on 22 October 1999 and played initially on the Ladies European Tour. In her rookie season in 2000 she earned the Bill Johnson Rookie of the Year award as the leading rookie on the LET Order of Merit. She qualified for the LPGA Tour in 2002. Her best finish on the LPGA Tour is a tied for second at the 2004 ShopRite LPGA Classic. Her best finishes on the Ladies European Tour are second at the 2011 Sicilian Ladies Italian Open and tied for second at the 2011 New Zealand Women's Open. She also finished tied for second at the unofficial 2009 European Nations Cup.

After the conclusion of the 2013 Women's British Open, she was chosen by Liselotte Neumann as one of her four captain's selections to the 2013 European Solheim Cup Team for the matches to be held in Colorado.

Personal life
Sergas currently lives in Palm Springs, California.

Results in LPGA majors
Results not in chronological order before 2015.

^ The Evian Championship was added as a major in 2013

CUT = missed the half-way cut
WD = withdrew
"T" = tied

Summary

Most consecutive cuts made – 4 (twice)
Longest streak of top-10s – 2 (twice)

Team appearances
Amateur
European Ladies' Team Championship (representing Italy): 1997, 1999
Junior Ryder Cup (representing Europe): 1997
Espirito Santo Trophy (representing Italy): 1996, 1998

Professional
World Cup (representing Italy): 2005, 2007
Solheim Cup (representing Europe): 2013 (winners)

Solheim Cup record

References

External links

Italian female golfers
Ladies European Tour golfers
LPGA Tour golfers
Solheim Cup competitors for Europe
Olympic golfers of Italy
Golfers at the 2016 Summer Olympics
Mediterranean Games medalists in golf
Mediterranean Games gold medalists for Italy
Competitors at the 1997 Mediterranean Games
Sportspeople from Trieste
Sportspeople from Palm Springs, California
1979 births
Living people